Sajjad Kishwar (6 July 1933 – 24 May 2022) was a Pakistani film and television actor.

Awards 
2006 Lifetime Achievement Award, Radio Pakistan
2010 Lifetime Achievement Award, National Development Council
 Tamgha-e-Imtiaz

Filmography
He appeared in more than 100 films and 1000 television serials, including:

Films 

 2007 - Khuda Kay Liye

Television
 Raizgari
 Akhri Shab
 Waris

See also 
 List of Lollywood actors

References

External links
 Born to act - Daily Dawn

1933 births
2022 deaths
Male actors from Ludhiana
Male actors from Lahore
Pakistani male film actors
Pakistani male television actors